Utkala may refer to the following entities in the eastern Indian state Odisha :

 Utkala Kingdom (Odia: ଉତ୍କଳ), a historical realm in the northern and eastern portion of the modern-day Indian state of Odisha
 Utkala Brahmin is Brahmin caste in India. They are native to the present-day Odisha state.
 Utkala Dibasa, Odisha's independence day.
 Utkala Mani Gopabandhu Das, a honorific of the poet Gopabandhu Das as 'gem of Odisha.